Amalric of Nesle (died 1180) was a French prelate from Nesle in Picardy. He was prior of the Holy Sepulcher by 1151. He was Latin patriarch of Jerusalem by 1158 to 1180. He died October 6, 1180 in the Kingdom of Jerusalem.

References
 
 

Latin Patriarchs of Jerusalem
1180 deaths
Year of birth unknown
12th-century people of the Kingdom of Jerusalem
12th-century French people
12th-century Roman Catholic archbishops in the Kingdom of Jerusalem